Mitromorpha popeae is a species of sea snail, a marine gastropod mollusk in the family Mitromorphidae.

Description

Distribution
This species occurs in the Caribbean Sea off Guadeloupe.

References

popeae
Gastropods described in 2006